Watkins Family Farm Historic District, also known as Lakeland Farm, is a historic home and farm and national historic district located near Raymore, Cass County, Missouri. The farm includes 18 contributing buildings, three contributing sites, and 21 contributing structures dated between about 1868 and 1957. They include three residential buildings, eight barns, three machine and implement sheds, four wells, ten dams and ponds, and a number of ancillary structures such as a milk house, a pump house, an outhouse, a silo, two corn bins, two chicken coops, three cattle feeder structures, and a cattle loading ramp. The Allen-Watkins Residence was built in 1913, and is a -story, Prairie School style frame dwelling built from the Sears and Roebuck Company prefabricated kit for Sears House Plan #227, "The Castleton."

It was listed on the National Register of Historic Places in 2007.

References

Historic districts on the National Register of Historic Places in Missouri
Farms on the National Register of Historic Places in Missouri
Prairie School architecture in Missouri
Houses completed in 1913
National Register of Historic Places in Cass County, Missouri
1913 establishments in Missouri
Sears Modern Homes